Bengt-Åke Bengtsson (born 1 February 1938) is a retired Swedish rower. He competed in the eights at the 1960 Summer Olympics, but failed to reach the final.

References

1938 births
Living people
Swedish male rowers
Olympic rowers of Sweden
Rowers at the 1960 Summer Olympics
Sportspeople from Gothenburg